Talmassons is a comune (municipality) in the Province of Udine in the Italian region Friuli-Venezia Giulia, located about  northwest of Trieste and about  southwest of Udine.

Talmassons borders the following municipalities: Bertiolo, Castions di Strada, Lestizza, Mortegliano, Pocenia, Rivignano.

References

External links
 Official website 

Cities and towns in Friuli-Venezia Giulia